The 2016–17 season is the 69th season of competitive association football in Honduras.

National teams

Senior team

FIFA World Cup qualification

Copa Centroamericana

Other matches

Olympic team

Summer Olympics

Other matches

U-20 team

CONCACAF U-20 Championship

FIFA U-20 World Cup

Other matches

U-17 team

CONCACAF U-17 Championship

Other matches

Domestic clubs

Promotion and relegation

Summer transfers

Winter transfers

Liga Nacional

Apertura

Clausura

Liga de Ascenso

Liga Mayor

Honduran Cup

Honduran Supercup

CONCACAF Champions League

Other matches

Deaths

References

 
Honduras
Honduras
Football